El Huachi Airport was an airstrip near Santa Bárbara, a town in the Bío Bío Region of Chile.

Google Earth Historical Imagery (4/28/2007) shows an approximately  grass airstrip cut through a forested ridge. The (11/29/2009) image shows the runway and parking apron completely replanted to trees.

See also

Transport in Chile
List of airports in Chile

References 

Google Earth Historical Imagery (4/28/2007)

External links 
 Airport record for El Huachi Airport at Landings.com

Defunct airports
Airports in Biobío Region